Serge Blanc (born 22 September 1972) is a former French football player.

External links

1972 births
Living people
French footballers
France under-21 international footballers
Ligue 1 players
Montpellier HSC players
Olympique de Marseille players
Olympique Lyonnais players
Association football defenders
Competitors at the 1993 Mediterranean Games
Mediterranean Games bronze medalists for France
Mediterranean Games medalists in football